This was the first edition of the tournament since 2008.

Chris Guccione and André Sá won the title, defeating Pablo Cuevas and David Marrero in the final, 6–2, 7–5.

Seeds

Draw

Draw

References
 Main Draw

Nottingham Open - Men's Doubles
2015 Doubles